Wesley Kiprotich (born 1 August 1979, in Kericho) is a Kenyan middle distance runner who specialises in the 3000 metres steeplechase.

He is based at the PACE Sports Management training camp in Kaptagat.

Achievements

Personal bests
1500 metres - 3:43.37 min (2005)
3000 metres steeplechase - 8:05.68 min (2004)

External links

Pace Sports Management

1979 births
Living people
Kenyan male middle-distance runners
Kenyan male steeplechase runners
Athletes (track and field) at the 2006 Commonwealth Games
Commonwealth Games silver medallists for Kenya
Commonwealth Games medallists in athletics
Medallists at the 2006 Commonwealth Games